Hakan Arslan (born 18 July 1988) is a Turkish footballer who plays as a midfielder for Sivasspor.

Playing career
Arslan is a youth product of İstanbul Güngörenspor having joined their youth academy in 1998, and started his professional career with them. He transferred to Samsunspor in 2011 and made his professional debut with them in a 2-2 Süper Lig tie with MKE Ankaragücü on 4 November 2011. He transferred to Sivasspor in 2013.

Honours
Sivasspor
 Turkish Cup: 2021–22

References

External links
 
 
 

1988 births
Living people
People from Fatih
Footballers from Istanbul
Turkish footballers
Samsunspor footballers
Sivasspor footballers
Kasımpaşa S.K. footballers
Süper Lig players
TFF First League players
TFF Second League players
Association football midfielders